Mukhari (pronounced mukhāri) is a rāga in Carnatic music (musical scale of South Indian classical music). It is a janya rāga of Kharaharapriya.

Structure and Lakshana 
 Arohana: 
 Avarohana:

Popular Compositions 

 Indu Enage Govinda  by Raghavendra Swami (Also sung in Mukhari)
Palisemma Muddu Sharade, Chitta Shuddhi illadava By Purandara Dasa
 Brahma Kadigina Padamu  by Annamacharya
 Pahimaam Rathnachala by Muthuswami Dikshitar
 Entaninne by Tyagaraja
 Ksheenamai by Tyagaraja
 Karubaru Cheyuvaru by Tyagaraja
 Elavatara by Tyagaraja
 Sangeeta Sastra by Tyagaraja
 Talachi Nantane by Tyagaraja 
 Muripemu by Tyagaraja
 Endraikku Siva Krupai by Neelakanta Sivan
 Emani Ne by Subbaraya Sastri
 Ososi Namadi by Kshetrayya
 Dasaratha Rama by Bhadrachala Ramadasu
 Sivakama sundari by Papanasam Sivan
 Krishnam Kalaya by Narayana Teertha

Less-known Compositions 
Anandam Anandam Anandame, which is played by the orchestra at a Hindu wedding, immediately after the groom ties the mangalsutra on the bride's neck, evoking emotions of happiness and sorrow between the groom and bride's family members.

Film Songs

Language:Tamil

Notes

References

Janya ragas
Janya ragas (kharaharapriya)